"Filthy" is a song by American singer-songwriter Justin Timberlake. It was released on January 5, 2018, as the lead single from his fifth studio album, Man of the Woods (2018). The electro-funk song was written and produced by Timberlake, Timbaland, and Danja, with additional songwriting from James Fauntleroy and Larrance Dopson. Its music video was released on same day, which is set at a futuristic technology conference and shows Timberlake staging a proof-of-concept demo for a robot. It was serviced to contemporary hit radio on January 9, 2018. "Filthy" debuted at number 9 on the US Billboard Hot 100, becoming Timberlake's 18th top 10 on the chart as a soloist, and reached the top 5 in Canada.

Production
"Filthy" was revealed as the first single the day after Man of the Woods was confirmed. Timberlake, Timbaland and Danja first collaborated on FutureSex/LoveSounds. All three artists co-wrote the song along with James Fauntleroy, who co-wrote all songs on The 20/20 Experience and all but two songs on The 20/20 Experience – 2 of 2 and Larrance Dopson of production team 1500 or Nothin'.

Recording for "Filthy" was handled by Danja and Timbaland. The duo worked on the song in a separate studio, while Timberlake worked between two other studios, which had Chad Hugo and Pharrell Williams of The Neptunes in one room, and Rob Knox of The Y's and Eric Hudson in the other. Timberlake would compose certain sections of the song in his head, as he did in the FutureSex/LoveSounds sessions as well. Danja added screams, moans and breaths into the song, as well as the sound of a lion roaring. While the breakdown was conceptualised by Timberlake - Timbaland and Danja would create the breakdown as Timberlake would sing the melody. Danja also experimented with the idea of hi-hats in the song but felt that they didn't "...feel right. It dates it, puts it into a place of what's happening right now. That's not where you want to be."

Composition
"Filthy" is an electro funk and R&B song. The song comprises funky electro-R&B elements. Billboard noted the song is a combination of anthemic rock with electro. The track opens with guitar licks, and it morphs into a "sleekly" industrial neo-funk number, complete with synth and a "snaking" bassline. Timberlake speaks/sings tongue-in-cheek lyrics during the track. As noted by Rolling Stones Elias Leight, Timberlake keeps his voice in the middle of mix, "so the singer and the music are equal partners." The outro features vocals from Jessica Biel. The song was written in the key of A-flat Minor, with Timberlake's vocals spanning from Eb3 to Ab4.

Critical reception
The Guardian journalist Ben Beaumont-Thomas gave the song five-out-of-five stars, and said in his review, "On the basis of Filthy, he absolutely can. Beginning with some bombastic guitar rock, it transmogrifies into a beautifully dark, undulating funk track underpinned by a whiplash bass womp". He described the song as a "grownup funk masterpiece," and added "the chorus, which modulates into a sweeter, smoother key, is signature Timberlake." In XXL, C. Vernon Coleman II stated the production provides a "fitting soundscape for the single, as they deploy out of this world synths with pulsating 808s." In NME, Larry Barleet reacted positively, stating "Timberlake pulls it off," and adding "what's really brilliant about 'Filthy' is that it's proof that JT isn't done with innovating." Also from NME, Nick Reily described the track as "futuristic". Rap-Up opined the "dance-ready" track finds the team experimenting with "a new futuristic sound." Christopher R. Weingarten of Rolling Stone said it is "hard" to call the song pop "since the production is so avant-garde." He further commented the producers Timbaland and Danja "conjure a testosterone electronic chainsaw grind and match it with vintage Larry Graham-style slap bass: The fact that the two musical elements don't exactly match groovewise creates a beautiful and disorienting tension unlike anything on the radio."

Ed Masley of The Arizona Republic described it as a "suitably robotic, an electro-funk sex jam." Chris Willman of Variety thought the single and visuals in the context of the album may represent Timberlake's former self "albeit one who's clearly still capable of coming to the phone, still getting his sexy-back kicks in before the muse draws him into a more reflective forest." In Billboard, Katie Atkinson ranked it 11 among all Timberlake's singles, and felt "the funky Timbaland beat and tongue-in-cheek lyrics were a welcome, loose surprise." Jon Caramanica of The New York Times opined it is an "unimaginative but slyly effective electro-funk vamp with acid house accents... It's cyclical and deliberate, like late-1970s big-band soul music." In The Ringer, Lindsay Zoladz opined it "sounds like a new-millennium update of David Bowie's "Fame." Bryan Rolli of The Daily Dot said the song "sounds right at home next to other JT smash hits such as "Suit & Tie" and "SexyBack," while the singer "delivers a sensual, understated vocal performance." Radio station Capital FM listed it among the seven best songs, and Capital XTRA included it among the best R&B songs, of the first bimester of 2018.

Other writers expressed unfavorable opinions. In Pitchfork,  Katherine St. Asaph criticized its lyrics and sound. Will Lavin of Joe thought it sounds "dated, clunky and out of touch." Eric Renner of Entertainment Weekly called it "empty" and said it is a "stuttering mess of electronic and funk".

Music video

Timberlake shared a teaser of the video on January 4. The official music video was directed by Mark Romanek and premiered along with the song. Timberlake plays an inventor introducing his new work, a robot to the public. As a character inspired by Steve Jobs, Timberlake takes the stage at the Pan-Asian Deep Learning Conference in Kuala Lumpur, Malaysia, in 2028 and debuts the robot. In the dance-centric visual, the artificial intelligence machine displays dance moves while being remotely manipulated by Timberlake. As the video progresses, the robot performs more elaborate and erotic dance moves with the dancers, being rewarded with an enthusiastic ovation from the previously expressionless audience. The line between creator and his invention blurs by the clip's end, as described by a Rolling Stone reviewer. For the CGI character, Timberlake and several dancers performed the motions that became the robot's moves in the final product.

About Timberlake's outfit in the video, Rachel Hahn of Vogue deemed it a modern version of Jobs' iconic look. Timberlake wears a Todd Snyder turtleneck with wire-frame glasses, a pair of gray pants, and classic white sneakers. "Filthy" received a nomination for an MTV Video Music Award for Best Choreography.

Credits and personnel 

Justin Timberlake – production, vocal production
Timbaland – production
Danja – production
Chris Stapleton – guitar
Larrance Dopson – keyboard
Chris Godbey – engineer
Ben Sedano – assistant engineering
Jessica Biel – additional vocals
Elliot Ives – guitar

Charts

Certifications

Release history

References

External links

2018 singles
2018 songs
Fiction set in 2028
Funk songs
Justin Timberlake songs
Music videos directed by Mark Romanek
RCA Records singles
Song recordings produced by Danja (record producer)
Song recordings produced by Justin Timberlake
Song recordings produced by Timbaland
Songs written by Danja (record producer)
Songs written by James Fauntleroy
Songs written by Justin Timberlake
Songs written by Timbaland
Songs written by Larrance Dopson